The Connector may refer to:

"The Connector," nickname for the Fairfax Connector.
The Connector, a musical by Jason Robert Brown.
The Connector (student newspaper), the student run newspaper of University of Massachusetts Lowell
The Connector, an online student news publication of Savannah College of Art and Design
The Connector (Cincinnati), a streetcar system in Cincinnati, Ohio

See also
 Connector (disambiguation)
 The Connection (disambiguation)